The 1912 Baylor football team was an American football team that represented Baylor University as an independent during the 1912 college football season. In its third season under head coach Ralph Glaze, the team compiled a 3–5 record and was outscored by a total of 123 to 79.

Schedule

References

Baylor
Baylor Bears football seasons
Baylor Bears football